The Vickers Valentia was a 1920s British flying boat designed during the First World War.

History
Three Valentia prototypes were built by the Vickers Company at their Barrow works (Walney Island perhaps), having been ordered in May 1918 as a potential replacement for the Felixstowe F.5. The hull was built by S.E.Saunders works at Cowes. The first of the three (Serial Number N124) first flew on 5 March 1921, when Stanley Cockerell began test-flying it over the Solent. N124 was damaged on landing in June 1921 and was dismantled, the second N125 forced landed on its delivery flight on 15 March 1922 The third flying boat N126 was delivered in 1923 and used for trials until it was withdrawn from use in November 1924.

The name was later re-used for a transport aircraft, the Vickers Type 264 Valentia.

Specifications (Valentia)

See also

References

Andrews, C.F and Morgan, E.B. Vickers Aircraft since 1908. London:Putnam, 1988. .
London, Peter. British Flying Boats. Stroud, UK:Sutton Publishing, 2003. .

1920s British patrol aircraft
Flying boats
Valentia
Biplanes
Aircraft first flown in 1921
Twin piston-engined tractor aircraft